Mountain Vista may refer to:

Mountain Vista High School (Highlands Ranch, Colorado)
Mountain Vista Governor's School (Virginia State Governor's School)